Degrassi: Extra Credit is a series of graphic novels based upon the teen drama television series Degrassi: The Next Generation.  The graphic novel series is written by J. Torres and illustrated by Ed Northcott, and it is the basis for a set of Degrassi mangasodes.

Like most episodes of the show, each novel is named after a 1980s song. The storylines in Degrassi: Extra Credit are meant to cover and expand upon unseen plots and elements that have not been addressed on the series.

Volumes

References

External links
Degrassi: Extra Credit Blog
JTO | J. Torres Online
CTV.ca News Page
CBR News: "Degrassi: Extra Credit" Graphic Novels Officially Announced
Comicon.com News Page

Books based on Degrassi
Degrassi (franchise)
Degrassi: The Next Generation